Abd Bayan-e Qadim is a village in Abdoliyeh-ye Gharbi Rural District, in the Central District of Ramshir County, Khuzestan Province, Iran. At the 2006 census, its population was 41, in 5 families.

References 

Populated places in Ramshir County